Route 705 and Route 706 are Light Rail loop services of the MTR system in Tin Shui Wai in the northwestern New Territories, Hong Kong. Route 705 operates in an anticlockwise direction (i.e. the inner loop), and commenced service on 22 August 2004. Route 706 serves the clockwise direction (i.e. the outer loop), and began running on 9 April 2004. The two routes are marked as Tin Shui Wai Circular on station signage.

The line is a loop, starting at Tin Shui Wai, an interchange with the West Rail line Tin Shui Wai station. It then runs along Tin Shing Road, continues between the Tin Fu and Tin Ching public housing estates and along Wetland Park Road, reaching the northern tip of the town. It returns along Grandeur Terrace into Tin Shui Road, passing Tin Wah Road and the Tin Shui Wai Park and finally arrives back to Tin Shui Wai stop.

Stops

Route 705 (Anti-clockwise)

 Tin Shui Wai  (Tin Shui Wai station)
 Tin Tsz
 Tin Wu
 Ginza
 Tin Wing
 Tin Yuet
 Tin Sau
 Wetland Park
 Tin Heng
 Tin Yat
 Tin Fu
 Chung Fu
 Tin Shui
 Locwood
 Tin Yiu
 Tin Shui Wai  (Tin Shui Wai station)

Route 706 (Clockwise)

 Tin Shui Wai  (Tin Shui Wai station)
 Tin Yiu
 Locwood
 Tin Shui
 Chung Fu
 Tin Fu
 Tin Yat
 Tin Heng
 Wetland Park
 Tin Sau
 Tin Yuet
 Tin Wing
 Ginza
 Tin Wu
 Tin Tsz
 Tin Shui Wai  (Tin Shui Wai station)

705
Railway loop lines
Tin Shui Wai
Railway services introduced in 2004
2004 establishments in Hong Kong